Mitochondrial Rho GTPase 1 (MIRO1) is an enzyme that in humans is encoded by the RHOT1 gene on chromosome 17. As a Miro protein isoform, the protein facilitates mitochondrial transport by attaching the mitochondria to the motor/adaptor complex. Through its key role in mitochondrial transport, RHOT1 is involved in mitochondrial homeostasis and apoptosis, as well as Parkinson’s disease (PD) and cancer.

Structure
In mammals, RHOT1 is one of two Miro isoforms. Both isoforms share a structure consisting of two EF-hand motifs linking two GTP-binding domains and a C-terminal transmembrane domain that attaches the protein to the outer mitochondrial membrane (OMM). The EF-hand motifs serve as binding sites for the adaptor protein Milton and the kinesin heavy chain. These domains can also bind calcium ions, and the binding results in a conformational change that dissociates the mitochondrial surface from kinesin.

Function 
RHOT1 is a member of the Rho GTPase family and one of two isoforms of the protein Miro: RHOT1 (Miro1) and RHOT2 (Miro2). Compared to the rest of the Rho GTPase family, the Miro isoforms are considered atypical due to their different regulation. Moreover, the Miro isoforms are only expressed in the mitochondria.

Miro associates with Milton (TRAK1/2) and the motor proteins kinesin and dynein to form the mitochondrial motor/adaptor complex. Miro functions to tether the complex to the mitochondrion while the complex transports the mitochondrion via microtubules within cells. Though Miro has been predominantly studied in neurons, the protein has also been observed to participate in the transport of mitochondria in lymphocytes toward inflamed endothelia.

The motor/adaptor complex is regulated by calcium ion levels. At high concentrations, calcium ions arrest mitochondrial transport by binding Miro, causing the complex to detach from the organelle. Considering that physiological factors such as activation of glutamate receptors in dendrites, action potentials in axons, and neuromodulators may elevate calcium ion levels, this regulatory mechanism likely serves to keep mitochondria in such areas to provide calcium ion buffering and active export and, thus, maintain homeostasis.

In addition, Miro regulates mitochondrial fusion and mitophagy in conjunction with mitofusin. According to one model, damaged mitochondria are sequestered from healthy mitochondria by the degradation of Miro and mitofusin. Miro degradation halts their movement while mitofusin degradation prevents them from fusing with healthy mitochondria, thus facilitating their clearance by autophagosomes.

Though the exact mechanisms remain to be elucidated, RHOT1 has been implicated in promoting caspase-dependent apoptosis.

Clinical significance 

Studies indicate that Miro may be involved in PD. In neurons, Miro interacts with two key proteins involved in PD, PINK1 and Parkin. Following depolarization of the mitochondria, PINK1 phosphorylates Miro at multiple sites, including S156, and Parkin ubiquitinates Miro, targeting it for proteasomal degradation. Degradation of Miro then halts mitochondrial transport.

Though the Rho GTPase family is closely associated with cancer progression, there are few studies demonstrating such association with the atypical Miro proteins. Nonetheless, RHOT1 has been implicated in pancreatic cancer as a tumor suppressor through its regulation of mitochondrial homeostasis and apoptosis. Thus, this protein could serve as a therapeutic target for cancer treatment.

Model organisms

Model organisms have been used in the study of RHOT1 function. A conditional knockout mouse line, called Rhot1tm1a(EUCOMM)Wtsi was generated as part of the International Knockout Mouse Consortium program — a high-throughput mutagenesis project to generate and distribute animal models of disease to interested scientists.

Male and female animals underwent a standardized phenotypic screen to determine the effects of deletion. Twenty six tests were carried out on mutant mice and one significant abnormality was observed: no homozygous mutants survived until weaning. The remaining tests were carried out on heterozygous mutant adult mice and no further abnormalities were observed.

Interactions 

RHOT1 has been shown to interact with:
 ALEX3, 
 DISC1,
 Dynein, 
 HUMMR, 
 kinesin heavy chain (KHC), 
 Mitofusin (MFN1/MFN2), 
 Milton (TRAK1/TRAK2), 
 Parkin, 
 PINK1, and
 OGT.

References

Further reading 

 
 
 
 
 
 
 

Genes mutated in mice
EF-hand-containing proteins